Cyril Patrick Mulroyan (14 February 1907 – 29 August 1945) was an  Australian rules footballer who played with Geelong in the Victorian Football League (VFL).

Employment
Mulroyan worked as a meat inspector.

Death
He died, aged 38, when he was thrown from his skidding bicycle while riding to work in Geelong.

Notes

External links 

1907 births
1945 deaths
Australian rules footballers from Victoria (Australia)
Geelong Football Club players
Road incident deaths in Victoria (Australia)
Cycling road incident deaths